Beka Tugushi (born 24 January 1989) is a Georgian football player, currently playing for Samtredia.

Club career
Tugushi spent the first years of his career in Finland, playing for KooTeePee and PK-35 Vantaa. He later returned to Georgia.

International
Tugushi made his debut for the Georgia national football team on 23 January 2017 in a friendly against Uzbekistan.

External links
 
 
 Torpedo Kutaisi player profile

References

1989 births
Footballers from Tbilisi
Living people
Footballers from Georgia (country)
Georgia (country) international footballers
Association football midfielders
FC KooTeePee players
PK-35 Vantaa (men) players
FC Kolkheti-1913 Poti players
FC Torpedo Kutaisi players
FC Metalurgi Rustavi players
FC Zestafoni players
Ethnikos Achna FC players
FC Samtredia players
Ykkönen players
Erovnuli Liga players
Cypriot First Division players
Expatriate footballers from Georgia (country)
Expatriate footballers in Finland
Expatriate footballers in Cyprus
Expatriate sportspeople from Georgia (country) in Finland
Expatriate sportspeople from Georgia (country) in Cyprus